Graebner or Gräbner is a German surname. Notable people with the surname include:

Carole Caldwell Graebner, (1943–2008), American tennis player
Clark Graebner, (born 1943), American tennis player
Fritz Graebner, (1877–1934), German ethnologist
Viktor Eberhard Gräbner (1914–1944), German SS officer

See also 
Grabner

German-language surnames